Mikael Kaj Forssell (born 15 March 1981) is a Finnish former football striker.

Forssell began his professional career in 1997 for HJK, having progressed through the team's youth teams, but he only remained at the club for a single season, making 17 league appearances, before he moved to England to join Chelsea in 1998. He never broke into the Chelsea team, making 33 league appearances in seven years, and spent two loan spells at Crystal Palace, one at Borussia Mönchengladbach, and two at Birmingham City. He switched permanently to the latter club in 2005, but injury problems restricted him to 65 league appearances in three seasons. He joined German side Hannover 96 in July 2008 on a free transfer, but once again struggled with form and injury problems, and he left the club in 2011, having made 44 league appearances. This was followed by an unsuccessful season back in England, this time with Leeds United; 15 league games failed to yield a single goal. Forssell returned to HJK in October 2012.

Forssell made his full international debut for Finland in 1999, and was a regular player for his country for the next 15 years. He earned 87 caps for his country, and scored 29 goals, making him Finland's sixth most capped player and second highest goalscorer.

Club career
Born in Steinfurt, Germany, and considered one of the most talented Finnish footballers of all time, Forssell made his Veikkausliiga debut for HJK at the age of just 16.

Chelsea
His goal-scoring form for Finland's youth teams made him a target for a host of Europe's top clubs, and in 1998, the 17-year-old striker was snapped up by Chelsea who at the time were managed by Gianluca Vialli. He made his debut as a substitute in a league game against Arsenal in January 1999 and then three days later, Forssell made his first start for the club when he scored two goals against Oxford United in the FA Cup. His first league goal came three weeks later, when he scored against Nottingham Forest. However, when Chelsea signed Chris Sutton for £10 million, Forssell was loaned out twice to Crystal Palace of the then First Division, scoring 16 league goals in just over 50 appearances.

Forssell found it hard to find a place in the Chelsea first team with Gianfranco Zola, Jimmy Floyd Hasselbaink, Tore Andre Flo and Eiður Guðjohnsen, who were all ahead of him in the pecking order. After initially impressing new manager Claudio Ranieri, scoring in four consecutive games, he was sent out on loan again and had spells at Borussia Mönchengladbach of the German Bundesliga and twice to Birmingham City of the Premier League. Forssell scored seven Bundesliga goals for Mönchengladbach in the spring of 2003 and then 17 Premier League goals for Birmingham in the 2003–04 season (more league goals than any other Chelsea player), during which he was the division's fifth highest goalscorer. He was named Premier League Player of the Month for March 2004, a month in which he scored twice in a 4–1 win against Leeds United, and won Birmingham's Player of the Year award.

He returned to Birmingham on loan for the 2004–05 season, but suffered the second serious knee injury of his career. He returned to Chelsea to recuperate, and made occasional appearances for Chelsea that season, playing against Bayern Munich in the Champions League and in the last home match, against Charlton Athletic, as Chelsea celebrated winning their first top-flight title for 50 years.

Birmingham City
In the summer of 2005, Forssell joined Birmingham on a three-year deal for a fee of £3 million, after Chelsea decided that he did not figure in their long-term plans. He struggled in the 2005–06 season, not having found his best form after his injury, and could not save Birmingham from relegation. Forssell suffered another cruel injury blow to his other knee during training in October 2006. This left him on the sidelines until he returned to training in February 2007 after undergoing operations on both knees. He remained at Birmingham to have another go at resurrecting his career.

His 2007–08 pre-season performances were good, he scored five goals in five games. His manager, Steve Bruce, was enthusiastic about his return to form. He continued his good form into the start of the season, scoring the opening goal of the match against Chelsea and consolidating his good form with two assists in the next three matches. He scored his first hat-trick at club level on 1 March 2008, in the 4–1 win over Tottenham Hotspur, a so-called "perfect hat-trick" – one goal scored with the left foot, one with the right, and one with the head. In his final season at Birmingham, he finished the season as their top scorer with nine goals as the club were relegated from the Premier League.

Hannover 96
In May 2008, following the club's relegation from Premier League, Forssell signed a pre-contract agreement to join Hannover 96 on a free transfer when his Birmingham contract expired at the end of June. His contract with Hannover ran out at the end of the 2010–11 season.

On his pre-season debut for Hannover, he scored 10 goals including an eight-minute hat-trick in one friendly game against amateurs FC Boffzen. The game ended up as a 23–0 win.

Leeds United
After leaving Hannover when his contract expired at the end of the 2010–11 season, Forssell had trials with clubs including West Ham United and Leeds United of the English Football League Championship (second tier). On 8 September he returned from international duty with Finland to sign a contract with Leeds until the end of the 2011–12 season. Forssell was handed the number 18 shirt and took his place on the bench two days later against his former club Crystal Palace. He came on as a second-half substitute to make his Leeds debut and assisted Ross McCormack for their winning goal in a 3–2 victory. He came on as a substitute against fierce rivals Manchester United in a 3–0 League Cup defeat.

After mainly being used as a substitute and failing to score a single goal for Leeds, Forssell was told by Neil Warnock that his one-year contract wouldn't be renewed at the end of the 2011–12 season and that he would be released from the club at the expiry of his contract.

Return to HJK
On 29 October 2012, it was announced that Forssell would be returning to Finland after spending 14 years abroad, signing a two-year contract with his former club HJK. On 22 April 2013, Forssell opened the scoring by a header, in a 2–0 away win over rivals Honka. He finished the season with 14 league goals, the club's top goalscorer as HJK won their fifth consecutive championship.

After a stint with German side VfL Bochum, Forssell rejoined HJK on 3 March 2016.

HIFK and retirement
On 10 April 2017, Forssell signed a contract for one year with HIFK. Forssell announced his retirement in May 2018.

International career
Forssell was a regular for the Finnish national team for most of the 2000s. He played his first match for Finland on 9 June 1999 against Moldova, and scored his first goal on 28 February 2001 against Luxembourg. He often partnered Jari Litmanen. Forssell also played for Finland in the 2001 FIFA World Youth Championship.

Forssell scored twice against Germany in a 2002 World Cup qualifier; the match ended 2–2.

Forssell scored two hat-tricks for Finland. On 7 September 2005, in Tampere, he scored three goals against FYR Macedonia in qualifying for the 2006 FIFA World Cup. On 17 November 2010, Forssell scored three of Finland's eight goals against San Marino in the Euro 2012 qualifying.

Personal life
Forssell's older sister, was also a footballer who played for HJK and Finland. On 23 August 2013, Forssell married Metti Lukkarila, the couple have Lilia, born in May 2014, and Lucas Mikael, born in August 2016.

Honours
HJK Helsinki
Veikkausliiga: 1997, 2013
Finnish Cup: 1998
Finnish League Cup: 1998

National
Finland
Nordic Football Championship: 2000–01

Individual
Premier League Player of the Month: March 2004

Career statistics

Club career

International

Appearances and goals by national team and year

International goals

Finland's score given first. As of 26 March 2013.

References

External links

 
 
 
 
  
 

1981 births
Living people
People from Steinfurt
Sportspeople from Münster (region)
Birmingham City F.C. players
Borussia Mönchengladbach players
Chelsea F.C. players
Crystal Palace F.C. players
Finnish expatriate footballers
Finnish expatriate sportspeople in England
Expatriate footballers in England
Finnish expatriate sportspeople in Germany
Expatriate footballers in Germany
Finnish footballers
Finland international footballers
Finland youth international footballers
Bundesliga players
2. Bundesliga players
Association football forwards
Hannover 96 players
Leeds United F.C. players
Helsingin Jalkapalloklubi players
VfL Bochum players
Veikkausliiga players
Premier League players
Swedish-speaking Finns
English Football League players
Footballers from North Rhine-Westphalia